The Freight House is a historic railroad building just north of Union Station in the Crossroads Arts District of Kansas City, Missouri.  The renovated Freight House is now home to three award-winning restaurants: Fiorella's Jack Stack Barbecue, Grunauer (German and Austrian food) and Lidia's.  The building is located immediately east of the Stuart Hall Building, and it is connected via pedestrian bridge to Union Station.  The pedestrian bridge was added in 2003, and its main component is an 1892 railroad span that had been sitting unused on the river bluffs until it was moved to its new location.  

The Freight House was originally constructed in 1887. The building housed freight unloaded from the trains until merchants picked up the freight and transported it to the numerous warehouses nearby.

Redevelopment
Over the years, the structure fell into severe disrepair until it was purchased by a group of investors in 1995.

The first restaurant to open at the Freight House was Lidia’s Kansas City.  Lidia's is an Italian restaurant that was opened by celebrity chef Lidia Bastianich in October 1998. The interior of the restaurant was designed by architect and designer David Rockwell.

Fiorella's Jack Stack Barbecue was the second restaurant to open in the Freight House. It opened its third location at the west end of the building in Fall 2000, and it continues to occupy that location.

City Tavern opened in 2002 in the middle of the three Freight House restaurant spaces, and enjoyed success over the years until it closed in April 2010. Following the closing of City Tavern, acclaimed Austrian-born chef Peter Grunauer opened a Viennese restaurant in May 2010 in the space formerly occupied by City Tavern. The restaurant, known as Grunauer, is operated by Peter, his daughter Elisabeth, and his son Nicholas. Other relatives of the Grunauer family also operate a restaurant of the same name in the artsy Neubau district of Vienna, Austria

References

Railway stations in the United States opened in 1887
Rail infrastructure in Missouri
Restaurants in Kansas City, Missouri
Railway freight houses
Crossroads, Kansas City
1887 establishments in Missouri